The 2013–14 season was the 57th season in RK Zamet's history. It is their 6th successive season in the Dukat Premier League, and 36th successive top tier season.

First team squad

Goalkeeper
 1  Korado Juričić
 12  Dino Slavić
 16  Matko Vukić

Wingers
RW
 3  Sandro Samardžić
 6  Dario Černeka

LW
 2  Damir Vučko 
 4  Marijan Klić
 9  Viktor Stipčić

Line players
 7  Milan Uzelac (captain)
 10  Tomislav Karaula
 20  Jadranko Stojanović

Back players
LB
 8  Bojan Lončarić
 11  Josip Jurić-Grgić
CB
 17  Raul Valković
 18  Matija Golik
RB
 5  Luka Mrakovčić
 13  Luka Kovačević

Injured
 Marin Đurica

Technical staff
  President: Zlatko Kolić
  Sports director: Alvaro Načinović
  Head Coach: Marin Mišković 
  Assistant Coach: Valter Matošević
  Goalkeeper Coach: Valter Matošević
  Fitness Coach: Ante Kapova
  Tehniko: Williams Černeka

Competitions

Overall

Dukat Premier League

League table

Matches

Play-offs table

Matches

Croatian Cup

Matches

Friendlies

Transfers

In

Out

External links
Official website of RK Zamet (Croatian)
European record  (English)

References

RK Zamet seasons